Mu Herculis (μ Herculis) is a nearby quadruple star system about 27.1 light years from Earth in the constellation Hercules.  Its main star, Mu Herculis A is fairly similar to the Sun although more highly evolved with a stellar classification of G5 IV. Since 1943, the spectrum of this star has served as one of the stable anchor points by which other stars are classified. Its mass is about 1.1 times that of the Sun, and it is beginning to expand to become a giant.

Etymology  

In the catalogue of stars in the Calendarium of Al Achsasi Al Mouakket, this star was designated Marfak Al Jathih Al Aisr, which was translated into Latin as Cubitum Sinistrum Ingeniculi, meaning the left elbow of kneeling man.

From this Chinese title, the name Kew Ho appeared.

Star system 
Mu Herculis is a quadruple star system. The brightest star is a well-studied G-type subgiant, whose parameters are precisely determined from asteroseismology. It was believed to be a close binary with a low-mass stellar or a large substellar companion. This was confirmed when low-mass companion was resolved using near-infrared spectroscopy. This pair is also known as Mu1 Herculis.

The secondary component, also known as Mu2 Herculis, consists of a pair of stars that orbit about each other with a period of about 43 years. Mu Herculis A and the binary pair B-C are separated by some 35 arcseconds. The stars B and C, which orbit each other, are separated from each other by 1.385 arcseconds, and have a slightly eccentric orbit, at 0.1796.

See also
 List of star systems within 25–30 light-years

References

External links
Jim Kaler's Stars, University of Illinois: MU HER (Mu Herculis)
SolStation: Mu Herculis 4

Hercules (constellation)
4
G-type subgiants
M-type main-sequence stars
Herculis, Mu
Herculis, Mu
Herculis, 086
086974
6623
0695
Durchmusterung objects
161797